Percy Rojas Montero (born September 16, 1949) is a retired football midfielder from Peru. He played on Selección de fútbol de Perú at two FIFA World Cups (1978 and 1982). He played in the 1975 Copa América Finals with the Peru national team.

Professional career
At the professional level he played for Universitario de Deportes, Independiente (Argentina), Sporting Cristal and Sérésien (Belgium). When he was with Indepndentiente they won the 1975 Copa Libertadores Cup, the Primera División del Perú with Universitario (1967, 1969, 1971, 1974 and 1982) and two more with Sporting Cristal (1979, 1980).
In 1975 he was transferred to Independiente, a club with which he finally won the Copa Libertadores scoring a goal in the final and with which he won the Copa Interamericana the following year.

International career
Rojas made 49 appearances with the Selección de fútbol de Perú from 1969 to 1979.
He was part of the Peruvian soccer team that won the 1975 Copa América and reached the second round of the 1978 FIFA World Cup.

He has become a television commentator.

Honors

References

External links

Weltfussball profile 

1949 births
Living people
Footballers from Lima
Association football midfielders
Peruvian footballers
Peru international footballers
Club Universitario de Deportes footballers
Club Atlético Independiente footballers
Sporting Cristal footballers
R.F.C. Seraing (1904) players
Peruvian expatriate footballers
Expatriate footballers in Argentina
Expatriate footballers in Belgium
Peruvian Primera División players
Argentine Primera División players
1975 Copa América players
1978 FIFA World Cup players
1982 FIFA World Cup players
Copa América-winning players